Melipotis fasciolaris, the fasciolated melipotis or bewitching melipotis, is a species of moth in the family Erebidae. It is found from Georgia and Florida west through Texas to California, south through Central America and the Caribbean to Uruguay.

Adults are sexually dimorphic, with males having a pale whitish to yellowish diagonal band in the antemedian area of the forewings, while in females the basal area of the forewings is light yellowish-brown. The rest of the forewings is dark brown in both males and females, except for a somewhat lighter subterminal area and a large pale reniform spot. The hindwings are black with a large white basal patch and white stripes along the outer margin in both the anal angle and the apical area. Adults are on wing year-round.

The larvae feed on the leaves of Prosopis species. Adults are a pollinator of fetterbush lyonia.

References

Moths described in 1831
Melipotis